
Stephanie Kusie  (born 1973) is a Canadian politician and former diplomat who was elected to the House of Commons of Canada in a by-election on April 3, 2017. She represents the electoral district of Calgary Midnapore in Alberta as a member of the Conservative Party of Canada and serves as Shadow Minister of Treasury Board in the Official Opposition Shadow Cabinet of the 44th Parliament of Canada.

Personal life
Kusie received a B.A. in political science from the University of Calgary and an M.B.A. from Rutgers University. She was chargé d'affaires ad interim for Canada to El Salvador and consul for Canada to Dallas, Texas. She served as a senior policy advisor to Peter Kent on Latin America. Her responsibilities included negotiating free trade deals, work related to the Keystone Pipeline project, and lobbying the United Nations to place Canada on the Security Council.

Political career
Kusie ran for Calgary City Council in 2013 but did not win a seat. After the election, she worked on Preston Manning's Municipal Governance Project.

The Conservative Party nominated Kusie for the 2017 Calgary Midnapore by-election; she succeeded former cabinet minister Jason Kenney, who had resigned as Calgary Midnapore's Conservative MP in 2016.

After being elected in 2017, Kusie was appointed as the Official Opposition Deputy Shadow Minister for Health. In September 2018, she took over the position of Official Opposition Shadow Minister for Democratic Institutions and became a vice-chair of the Standing Committee of Procedure and House Affairs In the same year, she accepted invitations to become a member of both the Trilateral Commission and CANZUK. She was most recently elected to the executive committee of the Canadian Section of ParlAmericas Interparliamentary Association.

Following the fall 2019 general election, Kusie served as the Shadow Minister for Families, Children, and Social Development, a role she held until September 2020, when incoming Conservative Party Leader, Erin O’Toole, appointed her as the Shadow Minister of Transport in his new Shadow Cabinet.

Kusie was re-elected in the 2021 federal election. Following the 2022 Conservative Party of Canada leadership election, Pierre Poilievre appointed a new Shadow Cabinet in October 2022 with Kusie in Treasury Board.

Electoral record

Federal

Municipal

References

External links

Living people
Canadian women diplomats
Women members of the House of Commons of Canada
Conservative Party of Canada MPs
Members of the House of Commons of Canada from Alberta
Rutgers University alumni
University of Calgary alumni
Women in Alberta politics
21st-century Canadian politicians
21st-century Canadian women politicians
Politicians from Calgary
1973 births